The 1996–97 NBA season was the Timberwolves' 8th season in the National Basketball Association. In the 1996 NBA draft, the Timberwolves selected shooting guard Ray Allen from the University of Connecticut with the fifth overall pick, but soon traded him to the Milwaukee Bucks in exchange for top draft pick point guard Stephon Marbury out of Georgia Tech. The team also acquired James Robinson from the Portland Trail Blazers, and second-year center Cherokee Parks from the Dallas Mavericks, while signing free agents, rookie center Dean Garrett, second-year guard Chris Carr, and Stojko Vrankovic during the off-season. However, Michael Williams would miss the entire season with a strained plantar fascia in his left heel.

After a 7–8 start to the season, the Timberwolves lost nine of their next ten games, but then played around .500 as the season progressed, holding a 23–25 record at the All-Star break. The addition of Marbury made a positive effect on the entire team, as second-year star Kevin Garnett and Tom Gugliotta became the first Wolves to be selected to the All-Star team, both being selected for the 1997 NBA All-Star Game, which was Garnett's first All-Star appearance. The Timberwolves went on to make their first ever playoff appearance, finishing third in the Midwest Division with a 40–42 record, which was below .500, but still good enough for the #6 seed in the Western Conference.

Gugliotta led the team with 20.6 points, 8.7 rebounds and 1.6 steals per game, while Garnett averaged 17.0 points, 8.0 rebounds, 1.4 steals and 2.1 blocks per game, and Marbury provided the team with 15.8 points and 7.8 assists per game, was selected to the NBA All-Rookie First Team, and also finished in second place in Rookie of the Year voting behind Allen Iverson of the Philadelphia 76ers. In addition, Sam Mitchell played a sixth man role, averaging 9.3 points and 4.0 rebounds per game off the bench, while Garrett provided with 8.0 points, 7.3 rebounds and 1.4 blocks per game, and Doug West contributed 7.8 points per game. Off the bench, Robinson contributed 8.3 points per game, and Terry Porter provided with 6.9 points and 3.6 assists per game. 

However, in the Western Conference First Round of the playoffs, the Timberwolves were swept by the Houston Rockets in three straight games. Following the season, Garrett signed as a free agent with the Denver Nuggets, while Robinson signed with the Los Angeles Clippers, and Vrankovic was traded to the Clippers.

For the season, the Timberwolves revealed a new primary logo of a gray wolf with pine trees, and changed their uniforms adding dark blue and black to their color scheme. Their primary logo and uniforms both remained in use until 2008.

Draft picks

Roster

Roster Notes
 Power forward Bill Curley missed the entire season rehabilitating from surgery on his right knee.
 Point guard Michael Williams missed the entire season due to a sore left heel injury.

Regular season

Season standings

z – clinched division title
y – clinched division title
x – clinched playoff spot

Record vs. opponents

Game log

Playoffs

|- align="center" bgcolor="#ffcccc"
| 1
| April 24
| @ Houston
| L 95–112
| Stephon Marbury (28)
| Kevin Garnett (9)
| three players tied (4)
| The Summit16,285
| 0–1
|- align="center" bgcolor="#ffcccc"
| 2
| April 26
| @ Houston
| L 84–96
| Stephon Marbury (22)
| Dean Garrett (14)
| Stephon Marbury (6)
| The Summit16,285
| 0–2
|- align="center" bgcolor="#ffcccc"
| 3
| April 29
| Houston
| L 120–125
| Tom Gugliotta (27)
| Dean Garrett (15)
| Stephon Marbury (13)
| Target Center19,006
| 0–3
|-

Player statistics

NOTE: Please write the players statistics in alphabetical order by last name.

Season

Playoffs

Awards and records
 Kevin Garnett, NBA All-Star
 Tom Gugliotta, NBA All-Star
 Stephon Marbury, NBA All-Rookie Team 1st Team

Transactions

References

See also
 1996–97 NBA season

Minnesota Timberwolves seasons
Timber
Timber
Monnesota